Süleyman Aktaş is a Turkish serial killer who murdered five people. He has been nicknamed "The Nailing Killer" due to his signature of nailing his victims' heads post-mortem.

Background and first murder
Süleyman Aktaş was born in Çambaşı. He was employed as a worker at the Turkish Electricity Company in Denizli, Turkey. He was severely injured by high voltage during works at a 31.5 kV electric power distribution line.

After this accident, he killed police superintendent Nuri Keskin in Antalya in 1986. He was arrested, and was placed in Manisa Psychiatric Hospital after the court ruled his mental disorder. Aktaş stayed four and a half years in the hospital before his 
release. He returned to his hometown of Çambaşı village in Bozkurt, Denizli.

Later murders, institutionalization, escape, and incarceration
In 1994, Süleyman Aktaş strangled four elderly neighbors three years after he came back to his hometown. He nailed the couples Ayşe (65) and İsmail Güneş (66), and Rukiye (77) and Ramazan Kocatepe (78) in the eyes and heads. In his testimony after his arrest, he stated that "He can not stand nails. He wants to nail people in the head." Aktaş was nicknamed "The Nailing Killer". He was hospitalized as diagnosed with paranoid schizophrenia. He escaped from the hospital, but was apprehended in the coach terminal.

In 2007, Aktaş was seen publicly for the first time after twelve years in a rehabilitation show program of the hospital. At noon of May 28, 2008, he assaulted his roommate, the child killer Ömer Yılmaz, and wounded him by hitting him in the head with a rock in the exercise yard of the hospital, where he had been kept in a special department for 13 years. Yılmaz underwent a head surgery in a nearby state hospital, and survived the attack. Aktaş also shared the same ward as Ayhan Kartal, the latter of whom feared him before his death in 2000.

See also
List of serial killers by country

References

Living people
Male serial killers
People from Bozkurt, Denizli
People with schizophrenia
Turkish escapees
Turkish serial killers
Year of birth missing (living people)